In Greek mythology, Euporie or Euporia is the goddess of abundance. She is one of the third generation of Horae.

Sources 
 Gaius Julius Hyginus, Fabulae Online (v. 183).

Greek goddesses
Children of Zeus
Harvest goddesses
Horae